The Northern Ireland War Memorial also called NI War Memorial and War Memorial was opened in 2007 in Talbot Street, Belfast, Northern Ireland. It replaced an earlier building called Memorial House which was located in Waring Street on a site which was bombed during the Blitz in 1941. It contains the Home Front Exhibition and the first national memorial to the hundreds killed in the Belfast blitz, created by Carolyn Mulholland.

Aim
The aim and purpose of the War Memorial is to:
 be an enduring memorial to those who fell in World War I and World War II.
 provide offices for the Royal British Legion and other ex-service charities.
 commemorate the association of the American Armed Forces with the Northern Irish during World War II.

See also
 Somme Heritage Centre
 The Cenotaph, Belfast
 List of public art in Belfast

References

External links
 Northern Ireland War Memorial

Military history of Northern Ireland
World War I museums in the United Kingdom
Museums established in 2007
World War II museums in the United Kingdom
Museums in Belfast
Military and war museums in Northern Ireland
The Royal British Legion